Mycetophila fisherae is a species of fungus gnats in the family Mycetophilidae.  The species was named after Maryland entomologist, bacteriologist, and bryologist Elizabeth Gault Fisher.

References

Mycetophilidae
Articles created by Qbugbot
Insects described in 1957